Malignant is a 2021 American horror film directed by James Wan from a screenplay by Akela Cooper, based on a story by Wan, Ingrid Bisu, and Cooper. The film stars Annabelle Wallis as a woman who begins to have visions of people being murdered, only to realize the events are happening in real life. Maddie Hasson, George Young, Michole Briana White, and Jacqueline McKenzie also star.

Malignant was theatrically released in the United States on September 10, 2021, by Warner Bros. Pictures and was also available to stream on HBO Max. The film grossed $34million against a budget of $40million and received mostly positive reviews from critics.

Plot
In 1993, Dr. Florence Weaver and her colleagues Victor Fields and John Gregory treat a violent, disturbed patient named Gabriel at Simion Research Hospital who is able to control electricity and broadcast his thoughts via speakers. After Gabriel kills several staff members, Dr. Weaver determines that he is a lost cause and the "cancer" must be removed.

27 years later, Madison Lake-Mitchell, a pregnant woman living in Seattle, returns home to her abusive husband, Derek. During an argument about her multiple previous miscarriages, Derek smashes Madison's head against a wall, causing her to bleed at the point of impact. After locking herself in her room, she had a nightmare of a person entering their house and killing Derek. To Madison's horror, the killer attacks her shortly after seeing Derek's corpse, knocking her unconscious.

Madison wakes up in a hospital and is informed by her sister, Sydney, that her unborn baby did not survive the attack. After being interviewed by police detective Kekoa Shaw and his partner Regina Moss, Madison returns home. Madison reveals to Sydney that she was adopted at 8 years old and has no memories of her prior life. The killer kidnaps a woman running a Seattle Underground tour and Madison continues to bleed at the back of her head. She later experiences another vision in which she helplessly watches Dr. Weaver being brutally bludgeoned by the killer.

During their investigation, Shaw and Moss discover a photo of Madison as a child in Weaver's house and learn that Weaver specialized in reconstructive surgery. Madison and Sydney approach the police after the former has a vision of the killer murdering Dr. Fields. The killer then calls Madison, revealing himself as Gabriel.

Madison and Sydney visit their mother and learns that Gabriel was an imaginary friend Madison spoke with during her childhood, but may also be someone she knew before her adoption. Shaw later finds a link between the doctors and Madison hidden on Dr. Weaver's record journals, leading him to discover the murder of Dr. Gregory.

The detectives enlist a psychiatric hypnotherapist to unlock Madison's memories. Madison recalls that her birth name is Emily May and that Gabriel almost led her to kill Sydney in the womb. After Sydney was born, Madison forgot about Gabriel. The kidnapped woman escapes and falls from the attic of Madison's home, revealing that Gabriel was secretly living there. Believing Madison to be the culprit behind the murders, the police arrest her while the woman, revealed to be Madison's biological mother Serena May, is taken to a nearby hospital.

Sydney visits the now-abandoned Simion hospital where Emily was treated and finds that Gabriel is Emily's parasitic twin brother who appeared as a half-formed child facing out of Emily's back. Weaver operated on Emily and was able to remove Gabriel's body except for the brain which he seals inside Emily's cranium. He remained dormant until Derek hit her head against the wall. Gabriel actually operates Madison's body backwards when he takes control, explaining his unnatural movements and the upside-down handprints at his crime scenes.

Provoked by fellow inmates in the lockup, Gabriel bursts out of Madison's skull and takes control of her body once more, slaughtering the inmates and almost the entire precinct staff before going to the hospital where Serena is recovering from her captivity. Sydney and Shaw intercept but are attacked by Gabriel. Sydney informs Madison that Gabriel caused her miscarriages because he was feeding on her fetuses to gain strength. As Gabriel attempts to kill Sydney for replacing him in Madison's life, Madison wakes up and takes back control of her body. In a black mindscape, she subconsciously locks an enraged Gabriel behind bars and says she will be ready after he promises to escape one day. With his influence gone, Gabriel sinks back inside her head.

Back in the hospital Madison lifts a hospital bed pinning Sydney and remarks that even though they are not related by blood, she will always love her as a sister. Serena looks on happily, while the electric humming that accompanied Gabriel's attacks can be heard faintly.

Cast

Production

In July 2019, it was announced that James Wan would direct the film at New Line Cinema from a screenplay by Akela Cooper and J. T. Petty, based on an original story he wrote alongside his wife Ingrid Bisu. Cooper ultimately received sole screenplay credit, with Wan, Bisu, and Cooper sharing "story by" billing; Wan served as a producer alongside Michael Clear under his Atomic Monster banner. That September, Wan officially revealed the title as Malignant, with Bloody Disgusting reporting the film would be in line with a giallo film. Bisu's fascination with medical anomalies led her to read about Edward Mordake, which inspired the Gabriel character.

On October 24, 2019, Wan clarified that the film is not based on his graphic novel Malignant Man, stating, "It's definitely not a superhero film [Malignant Man is a superhero]. Malignant is an original thriller not  any existing IP." He cited the influence of Italian horror filmmaker Dario Argento, particularly his films Tenebrae (1982), Phenomena (1985), and Trauma (1993).

In August 2019, Annabelle Wallis, George Young, and Jake Abel were cast in the film. In September 2019, Maddie Hasson, Michole Briana White, and Jacqueline McKenzie were also added, as was Mckenna Grace in March 2020.

Production began on September 24, 2019, in Los Angeles and concluded on December 8, 2019.

Release
Malignant was theatrically released in a few international markets (including France) on September 1, 2021, and then in the United States on September 10, distributed by Warner Bros. Pictures under the New Line Cinema banner. It was originally scheduled for release on August 14, 2020, but due to the COVID-19 pandemic, the film was removed from the release schedule in March 2020. As part of its plan for their 2021 films, Warner Bros. streamed Malignant simultaneously on HBO Max for one month, after which the film was removed until the normal home media release schedule period. The film is also released at the video-on-demand through digital streaming on October 22, 2021, and on Blu-ray and DVD on November 30, 2021. It was released on 4K on May 24, 2022.

Reception

Audience viewership 
According to Samba TV, the film was streamed by 753,000 U.S. households in its first weekend. By the end of its first month, the film had been watched in over 1.6 million U.S. households.

Box office 
Malignant grossed $13.5million in the United States and Canada, and $21.5million in other territories, for a worldwide total of $35million.
 
In the United States and Canada, Malignant was projected to gross $5–9million from 3,500 theaters in its opening weekend. It made $2million on its first day, and went on to debut to $5.6million, finishing third at the box office. It dropped 51% to $2.7million in its second weekend, finishing fifth.

Critical response 
On review aggregator Rotten Tomatoes, the film has an approval rating of 76% based on 170 reviews, with an average rating of 6.3/10. The website's critics consensus reads, "Although Malignant isn't particularly scary, director James Wan's return to horror contains plenty of gory thrills—and a memorably bonkers twist." On Metacritic, the film has a weighted average score of 51 out of 100 based on 23 critics, indicating "mixed or average reviews". Audiences polled by CinemaScore gave the film an average grade of "C" on an A+ to F scale, while PostTrak reported 59% of audience members gave it a positive score, with 38% saying they would definitely recommend it.

Andrew Barker of Variety wrote, "It's hard to say whether a film this bonkers 'works' or not, but it's impossible not to admire both the craft and the extravagant bad taste behind its go-for-broke energy." Meagan Navarro of Bloody Disgusting rated the film 3.5 out of 5 and said, "It's silly, it's outrageous, and it's a blast." Josh Millican of Dread Central gave the film 4 out of 5 and called it "the best horror movie of the year." Michael Gingold of Rue Morgue described the film as having "WTF energy" but criticized the implausibility of the plot, saying, "Too often, it's hard to know whether Wan and co. are kidding or not." A.A. Dowd of The A.V. Club gave the film a grade of B, describing it as "a zany psychodramatic creepfest that, here and there, veers into gory action hilarity, as though Pazuzu had taken over the body of a Batman movie". Charles Bramesco of The Guardian gave the film a score of 3 out of 5 stars, writing: "around the midway point... the script shifts gears into an agreeable register of B-movie lunacy, but it takes too much of the nearly two-hour run time to get there".

Frank Scheck of The Hollywood Reporter was more critical, writing: "The film might have been outrageously bizarre fun if it displayed any humor or ironic self-consciousness, but everything is played so straight that viewers will find themselves laughing not with the film, but at it." Lindsey Bahr of the Associated Press gave the film a score of 1 out of 4 stars, describing it as "simply ridiculous" and writing: "If you must see Malignant, a theater might honestly be the best bet. That way at least you can laugh along in utter shock with your fellow theater-goers." Simon Abrams of RogerEbert.com also gave the film 1 out of 4 stars, describing it as "a horror movie that is as long as it is underwhelming."

Some critics suggested the film was intended as parody or self-parody. Ian Linn of Study Breaks wrote, "Malignant seems to take these tropes of Wan’s earlier works to such extreme lengths it becomes difficult to see them as anything other than deliberate self-parody." Herpai Gergely of theGeek wrote, "Seeing Malignant, one almost wonders if, on the contrary, this joker is not knowingly laughing in the face of these new audiovisual actors. Indeed, everything in the film rhymes with parody. From the detective duo – reminiscent of Danny Pino and Tracie Thoms in Cold Case – to the script’s development, which resembles an entirely freewheeling Saw. Particular camera angles also give the impression of being too much, like this unbridled shot above the creepy haunted house. It’s hard to imagine that a brain capable of conceiving a horror film as deft as Insidious could produce such grotesque images without an ulterior motive."

References

External links
 
 

2021 films
2021 horror thriller films
2020s serial killer films
2020s slasher films
2020s monster movies
2020s supernatural horror films
American horror thriller films
American monster movies
American serial killer films
American slasher films
American supernatural horror films
Films about domestic violence
Films directed by James Wan
Films postponed due to the COVID-19 pandemic
Films produced by James Wan
Films scored by Joseph Bishara
Films set in Seattle
Films shot in Los Angeles
Films with screenplays by James Wan
HBO Max films
New Line Cinema films
Warner Bros. films
Parasitic twinning in culture
2020s English-language films
2020s American films